Richard Lowitt (February 25, 1922 – June 23, 2018) was an American historian. He was a professor of American History at Iowa State University, the University of Oklahoma, and the University of Science and Arts of Oklahoma, and the author of several books about the American West.

Early life
Lowitt was born on February 25, 1922, in New York City. His parents, Eugene Lowitt and Eleanor Lebowitz, were Hungarian immigrants. He graduated from the City College of New York, where he earned a bachelor's degree in 1943. He went to graduate school at Columbia University, where he earned a master's degree in 1945 and a PhD in 1950.

Career
Lowitt taught American History at Connecticut College, Florida State University, the University of Kentucky, the University of Maryland, and the University of Rhode Island. He joined Iowa State University, where he was the chair of the History department. He eventually became a professor of American History at the University of Oklahoma, and Regents Professor at the University of Science and Arts of Oklahoma.

Lowitt authored several books about the American West as well as biographies of George W. Norris and Bronson M. Cutting. He was awarded a Guggenheim Fellowship in 1957.

Personal life and death
Lowitt married Suzanne Carson. They had a son, Peter, and a daughter, Pamela. They resided in Concord, Massachusetts. His wife predeceased him.

Lowitt died on June 23, 2018, in Concord, Massachusetts.

Selected works

References

1922 births
2018 deaths
American people of Hungarian-Jewish descent
Educators from New York City
People from Concord, Massachusetts
City College of New York alumni
Columbia University alumni
Iowa State University faculty
University of Oklahoma faculty
University of Science and Arts of Oklahoma faculty
Writers from New York City
20th-century American Jews
Historians from Massachusetts
Historians from New York (state)
21st-century American Jews